Anne-Lise Kielland (28 October 1919 – 21 July 2005) was a Norwegian equestrian. She was born in Kristiania. She competed in equestrian at the 1956 Summer Olympics in Stockholm, where she placed 27th in individual mixed dressage, and seventh in the team competition (along with Else Christophersen and Bodil Russ).

References

External links

1919 births
2005 deaths
Sportspeople from Oslo
Norwegian female equestrians
Norwegian dressage riders
Equestrians at the 1956 Summer Olympics
Olympic equestrians of Norway
Norwegian sportswomen